Iglot is a 2011 Philippine television drama fantasy broadcast by GMA Network. The series is a spin-off to the 2004 television series Mulawin. It premiered on August 29, 2011 on the network's Telebabad line up. Directed by Gil Tejada Jr., it stars Milkcah Wynne Nacion. The series concluded on November 11, 2011 with a total of 55 episodes. It was replaced by Survivor Philippines: Celebrity Doubles Showdown in its timeslot.

The series is streaming online on YouTube.

Cast and characters

Lead cast
 Milkcah Wynne Nacion as Luningning / Isabella

Supporting cast
 Claudine Barretto as Mariella Dacera-Rivera
 Marvin Agustin as Anton Marco
 Jolina Magdangal as Ramona Sebastian / Ramona Salvador-Marco
 Luis Alandy as Juancho Rivera
 Pauleen Luna as Vesta Santana
 Patrick Garcia as Aldo
 Noel Urbano as the voice / puppeteer of "Iglot"
 Eddie Garcia as Celso Samar
 Lexi Fernandez as Danielle
 Hiro Peralta as Luis Bustamante
 Celia Rodriguez as lola Idang Salvador
 Jaime Fabregas as Dr. Petrovsky
 Mel Martinez as Rica
 Perla Bautista as Ester
 Sylvia Sanchez as Betty 
 Romnick Sarmienta as father Ruben
 Nicky Castro as Bal
 Veyda Inoval as Jona

Guest cast
 Bianca King as Aviona
 Richard Quan as Gardo
 Sheree Bautista as Gardo's wife 
 Louise delos Reyes as Hannah Dacera
 Shermaine Santiago as young Idang
 Angeli Nicole Sanoy
 Jao Mapa as mall officer
 Alvin Aragon as Nomer
 Zyrael Jestre as Chubby Palaboy
 Veyda Inoval

Ratings
According to AGB Nielsen Philippines' Mega Manila People/Individual television ratings, the pilot episode of Iglot earned a 12.6% rating, while the final episode scored a 25.6% rating in Mega Manila household television ratings.

References

External links
 

2011 Philippine television series debuts
2011 Philippine television series endings
Fantaserye and telefantasya
Filipino-language television shows
GMA Network drama series
Television shows set in the Philippines